Locarno railway station serves the city of Locarno, in the canton of Ticino, Switzerland. However, the station is located within the adjacent municipality of Muralto, near the shore of Lake Maggiore. The border between the two municipalities runs along the Torrente Ramogna stream, a short distance to the south and west of the station.

Since 1990, Locarno station has been divided into two distinct components, each served by a separately operated railway. At surface level, there is a standard gauge station, operated by the Swiss Federal Railways (SBB CFF FFS). That station is the terminal of a branch line from Giubiasco on the Gotthard Railway. Underground, there is another terminal station, for the metre gauge Domodossola–Locarno railway, an international rail link operated in Switzerland by the Regional Bus and Rail Company of Canton Ticino.

Before the station was renovated into this form, the metre gauge trains operated from a separate platform on the station forecourt. As part of the reconstruction, the standard gauge station was augmented by a new finger platform between tracks two and three. Additionally, the two railway lines' goods yards were removed, and the underground station constructed in their place.

Services 
 the following services stop at Locarno:

Gallery

Notes

References

External links 
 
 

Railway stations in Ticino
Swiss Federal Railways stations
Locarno